New Hope School(s) may refer to:

New Hope Rosenwald School, in Fredonia, Alabama, listed on the NRHP in Alabama
New Hope School (Wynne, Arkansas), listed on the NRHP in Arkansas
 New Hope Schools (Columbus, Mississippi), in the Lowndes County School District

See also
Hope School (disambiguation)
Hopewell School (disambiguation)